William Whyte may refer to:

Sir William Whyte (banker) (died 1945), Scottish banker
William Whyte (baseball) (1860–1911), American baseball player
William Whyte (footballer), Scottish footballer
William Whyte (historian) (born 1975), architectural and social historian
William Whyte (railway manager) (1843–1914), Canadian Pacific Railway Company executive
William Whyte (runner) (1903–1964), Australian athlete
William Foote Whyte (1914–2000), sociologist
William H. Whyte (1917–1999), sociologist and author of The Organization Man
William Pinkney Whyte (1824–1908), politician from the State of Maryland, United States
Sir William Whyte (solicitor) (died 1950), British solicitor
Sir William Marcus Charles Beresford Whyte (1863–1932), British naval officer
Sir (William Erskine) Hamilton Whyte (1927–1990), British diplomat
Bill Whyte, professor of social work at the University of Edinburgh

See also
William White (disambiguation)